Big Business is a 1929 silent Laurel and Hardy comedy short subject directed by James W. Horne and supervised by Leo McCarey from a McCarey (uncredited) and H. M. Walker script. The film, largely about tit-for-tat vandalism between Laurel and Hardy as Christmas tree salesmen and the man who rejects them, was deemed culturally significant and entered into the National Film Registry in 1992.

Plot 
Stan and Ollie play door-to-door Christmas tree salesmen in California. They end up getting into an escalating feud with grumpy would-be customer James Finlayson. Goaded by their repeated attempts to sell him a Christmas tree, he destroys it with hedge-clippers. Laurel and Hardy retaliate by damaging the man's doorframe with a knife. Finlayson then goes to work on their clothes, and this escalates, with his home and their car being destroyed in the melee (after Finlayson has run out of Christmas trees to mangle). A police officer (Tiny Sandford) steps in to stop the fight (after vases are thrown out and smashed, and one hits him on the foot) and negotiates a peaceful resolution. Stan and Ollie give the homeowner a cigar as a peace offering. However, as the pair make their escape and the homeowner happily lights the gratis smoking-device, it is revealed to be a "trick" cigar rigged with a hidden powder-charge, which promptly explodes in his face.

Production 
Producer Hal Roach bought a vacant house at 10281 Dunleer Drive, Cheviot Hills, Los Angeles from a studio worker so he could destroy it in the film. According to Roach, a mistake was made regarding the address, and the cast and crew demolished the wrong house. The owners of that home happened to be away on vacation and returned just as filming was being completed. Stan Laurel later said that Roach's story was a fabrication. However, Roach, at age 100, repeated the story as factual in a 1992 televised interview conducted by guest host Jay Leno on The Tonight Show Starring Johnny Carson.

Cast
 Stan Laurel as Stan
 Oliver Hardy as Ollie
 James Finlayson as the furious Home owner
 Tiny Sandford as the Policeman
 Lyle Tayo as the first Customer
 Charlie Hall as Neighbor

See also
 List of Christmas films

References

External links 
Big Business essay by Randy Skretvedt at National Film Registry 
Big Business essay by Daniel Eagan in America's Film Legacy: The Authoritative Guide to the Landmark Movies in the National Film Registry, A&C Black, 2010 , pages 158-159 
 
 
 
 

1929 films
1929 short films
American silent short films
American Christmas comedy films
American black-and-white films
Laurel and Hardy (film series)
Films directed by James W. Horne
Films directed by Leo McCarey
Metro-Goldwyn-Mayer short films
Films with screenplays by H. M. Walker
United States National Film Registry films
Films about trees
1920s Christmas comedy films
1920s American films
Silent American comedy films
1920s English-language films
English-language comedy films